Danielle Perpoli (Melbourne, 7 March 1968) is an Italian former sprinter (400 m).

Biography
In her career she won gold medals at the Italian Athletics Championships on four occasions, with two victories in the 200m and two in the 400m events.  She also won a gold medal at the Italian Athletics Indoor Championships in the 400m event.

National records
 4x400 metres relay: 3'26"69 ( Paris, 20 June 1999) - with Virna De Angeli, Francesca Carbone, Patrizia Spuri

Achievements

National titles
2 wins in 200 metres at the Italian Athletics Championships (1999, 2000)
2 wins in 400 metres at the Italian Athletics Championships (1995, 2002) 
1 win in 400 metres at the Italian Athletics Indoor Championships (2002)

See also
Italian all-time top lists - 200 metres
Italian all-time top lists - 400 metres

References

External links
 

1968 births
Italian female sprinters
Living people
Athletes from Melbourne
Naturalised citizens of Italy
Mediterranean Games silver medalists for Italy
Athletes (track and field) at the 2001 Mediterranean Games
World Athletics Championships athletes for Italy
Mediterranean Games medalists in athletics